Chicken bog is a pilaf dish made of rice and chicken.  It can include onion, spices, and sausage. A whole chicken is boiled until tender (with the sausage, onion, and spices, if included), then the rice is added and cooked until it absorbs all the liquid.  Cooks often pick the bones and other inedible parts out of the pot and discard them before adding the rice to the meat and other ingredients.   It is called Chicken "bog" because the chicken gets bogged down in the rice.

Loris, South Carolina celebrates an annual festival called the "Loris Bog-Off".  Chicken bog is made different ways in different places, but it is perhaps found most often in the Pee Dee and Lowcountry regions of South Carolina.

Origin of name
The name is believed to come from the "wetness" of the dish but some say it might be because the area where it is popular is very "boggy."

See also

 List of chicken dishes
 List of sausage dishes
 Lowcountry cuisine

References

Lowcountry cuisine
American rice dishes
American chicken dishes
Sausage dishes
Chicken and rice dishes